Joseph H. Alexander (January 24, 1938 – September 28, 2014) was a Colonel of the United States Marine Corps and a historian.

Education 
Joseph Hammond Alexander obtained master's degrees in history and national defense from North Carolina, Georgetown and Jacksonville Universities. He was also a graduate from the Naval War College.

Military career 
Joseph Alexander served in the Marine Corps for 29 years. He had been in command of a company during his time in Vietnam and then a battalion in Okinawa. He later served in amphibious ships at sea for five years. By the time he reached the rank of Colonel, he was Chief of Staff to the 3rd Marine Division.

Post-Military 
When Joseph Alexander retired, he began a new career as a writer.  He worked with Lou Reda Productions as chief historian and scriptwriter for their documentaries, which were aired on the History Channel of the Arts and Entertainment Network. He resided in Asheville, North Carolina. He was a member of the board of Habitat for Humanity and volunteers as a home builder. He died aged 76 in Asheville, North Carolina on September 28, 2014.

Selected publications
 Across the Reef
 Battle of the Barricades: U.S. Marines in the recapture of Seoul 
 Edson's Raiders: The 1st Marine Raider Battalion in World War II  
 A Fellowship of Valor: The History of the United States Marines  
 Fleet operations in a mobile war: September 1950-June 1951  
 Storm Landings: Epic Amphibious Battles in the Central Pacific  
 Sea Soldiers in the Cold War: Amphibious Warfare 1945-1991  
 Utmost Savagery: The Three Days of Tarawa

Awards 
 Naval Institute Author of the Year in 1996 
 Naval History Author of the Year in 2010
 Theodore And Franklin D. Roosevelt Prize In Naval History in 1995

References

External links
 
 

1938 births
2014 deaths
Naval War College alumni
United States Marine Corps colonels
Place of birth missing
American military historians
American male non-fiction writers